{{DISPLAYTITLE:Sigma1 Cancri}}

Sigma1 Cancri, Latinized from σ1 Cancri, is a solitary, white-hued star in the zodiac constellation of Cancer. It is faintly visible to the naked eye, with an apparent visual magnitude of +5.68. Based upon an annual parallax shift of 15.51 mas as seen from Earth, this star is located around 210 light years from the Sun.

This is a chemically peculiar A-type main sequence star with a stellar classification of A8 Vas. At an age of about 301 million years, Sigma1 Cancri is around 67% of the way through its main sequence lifespan. The star has 1.7 times the mass of the Sun and is radiating 18 times the Sun's luminosity from its photosphere at an effective temperature of 8,116 K. It has a magnitude 13.3 visual companion at an angular separation of 5.2 arc seconds along a position angle of 276°, as of 2011.

References

A-type main-sequence stars
Cancri, Sigma1
Cancer (constellation)
Durchmusterung objects
Cancri, 51
075698
043584
3519